Saint Ange, also known as House of Voices, is a 2004 French-Romanian horror film written and directed by Pascal Laugier. It is Laugier's feature film debut. The film stars Virginie Ledoyen, Catriona MacColl, Lou Doillon, and Dorina Lazăr.

Plot
In 1958, Anna Jurin accepts a job as a housekeeper of Saint Ange, a rusty and isolated orphanage located in the French Alps and owned by Madam Francard. The last batch of children have been sent elsewhere shortly after the mysterious death of a boy in the bathroom, which tarnishes the orphanage's reputation and threatens its closure. Other than Anna, the orphanage is now populated by only two people: the long-time cook Helenka and an adult orphan, Judith, who suffers from a mental disability and claims that there are other, unseen, children in the location.

Throughout her stay, Anna experiences apparent supernatural phenomena. However, Helenka dismisses her worries as mere hallucinations, especially after she learns that Anna is pregnant due to a gang rape, a fact that she tries to hide at first. Anna learns that Judith is one of the many sent to Saint Ange in 1946 as a war orphan of World War II; because of shortages of supplies and logistics, Judith is the only survivor.

Despite this explanation, Anna suspects that the orphanage deliberately killed and hid the children. She gains the trust of Judith by befriending and calming her when her kittens are apparently drowned by Helenka, enough for her to disclose that the children inhabit an area somewhere behind a mirror in bathroom, revealed to be an abandoned dormitory. Helenka tries to prevent them from heading to the area, but Judith knocks her unconscious. The two women proceed to the dormitory and find remains of toys and rotten food. Judith realizes that the children had really died and begs Anna to stop searching, but the latter insists on continuing and boards an elevator heading to the underground. Anna arrives at a sterile, hospital-like structure with clean white walls and brightly lit lamps. She is confronted by the children who rise from a series of murky baths, who surround her. Anna goes into a sudden labor and is helped to deliver the baby by the children but the newborn infant is stillborn when the stillbirth killed Anna.

Sometime later, Francard and her assistant search for Anna in the underground, which is now damp, dark, and rust-walled. They find Anna and her baby on the floor, both dead. Deciding to leave them there, the two head upstairs to leave the premises alongside Helenka and Judith; it is implied that Anna has been hallucinating the phenomena due to the stress, as she is revealed to be the true culprit for the drowning of the kittens. However, before they leave, Judith throws away her medication, as Anna advised her earlier, and peeks into Anna's former bedroom, where she sees her and her baby, now as spirits of Saint Ange, alongside the dead children. Francard comes back for Judith and the film ends as the room is seen empty.

Language
According to Christophe Gans, the film was shot both in French and English. The Canadian DVD has both cuts of the film.

Cast
 Virginie Ledoyen as Anna Jurin 
 Lou Doillon as Judith
 Catriona MacColl as Francard
 Dorina Lazăr as Helenka
 Virginie Darmon as Mathilde
 Jérôme Soufflet as Daniel
 Marie Herry as Marie
 Éric Prat as an unnamed social services worker

Production
Some thought that Virginie Ledoyen was actually five or six months pregnant during filming. The star in fact wore a prosthetic pregnancy for the shoot and spoke of the hard bodily work and physical discomfort this entailed: "We shot scenes in stifling heat, with my hair sticking to me, false blood on my face, and the latex stomach melting."

See also
List of ghost films

References

External links
 
 
 
 

2004 horror films
2004 films
Films directed by Pascal Laugier
2000s French-language films
English-language French films
English-language Romanian films
Films set in 1958
Films set in the Alps
Films set in France
2000s ghost films
Haunted house films
French supernatural horror films
Romanian supernatural horror films
2000s supernatural horror films
2004 directorial debut films
2000s French films